George Hutchison  may refer to:
 George Hutchison (New Zealand politician) (1846–1930), New Zealand politician from Taranaki
 George Hutchison (mayor) (1882–1947), Mayor of Auckland, New Zealand from 1931 to 1935
 George Hutchison (British politician) (1873–1928), Scottish Unionist Party Member of Parliament (MP) for Midlothian and Peebles Northern
 Ian Clark Hutchison (1903–2002), full name George Ian Clark Hutchison, Scottish Unionist Party MP for Edinburgh West

See also
George Hutchinson (disambiguation)